Orava is a reservoir in northernmost Slovakia, forming the largest lake in Slovakia (35.2 km2).

History

It was created by the construction of a dam between 1941 and 1953 on the former two sources of the Orava river. Several former villages had to be inundated for this purpose, including Hamri, Oszada, and Usztye. Probably the best known of them was Slanica,  Today, the reservoir is protected by the Horná Orava Protected Landscape Area.

The average depth of the reservoir is 15 meters.

Islands

Vtáčí ostrov 

In the northeastern extension of the reservoir lies Vtáčí ostrov ("Bird Island"), a government ornithological reservation with Protected Bird Area status. The nature reserve in and around the island is also part of the Horná Orava Protected Landscape Area.

Waterfowl species inhabiting the Bird Island reserve include herons, great cormorants, spoonbills and several others. The wetlands around the Orava reservoir are also regarded as some of the most important in Europe. The protection of the forests skirting the Orava Reservoir has helped prevent erosion.

Slanický ostrov 

Slanický ostrov ("Slanica Island") is the largest island of the reservoir and one of the largest lake islands of any water reservoir in Slovakia. The island is mildly forested with a series of groves, and includes some of the last architectural remnants of the defunct Oravan village of Slanica, the birthplace of 18th century Slovak intellectual, cleric and linguist Anton Bernolák (Antonius Bernolacius). The centrepiece of the surviving architecture is the original church of Slanica. A new building constructed after the creation of the Orava reservoir and the island is an art gallery. Slanica Island is the only island in Slovakia to house a museum of art or art gallery, with the gallery serving as its main tourist attraction, along with the preserved church.

Gallery 
Orava reservoir and its shores

Slanický ostrov

History and construction

References

O
O
O